Hubert Strolz (born 26 June 1962), nickname "Hubsi", is a former alpine skier from Austria. At the 1988 Olympics in Calgary he won a gold medal in the combined and silver in the Giant Slalom.

Career
In the World Cup, he won a combined competition 17 January 1988, in Bad Kleinkirchheim. This event was a part of the Hahnenkamm-races which were transferred to "BKK" (short name) because there was not enough snow in Kitzbühel. Hubert was a sober racer and an eternal runner-up by finishing 2nd for 14 times (and in 18 times he finished as the third, always in regard to the Alpine World Cup). He was on the way to win another gold medal in the combined at the 1992 Olympics in Albertville but he fell down in the second leg of the slalom just a short distance before the finish line. Like in that case (he saw it as compensation for having luck by winning the gold medal in Calgary, when the great favourite Pirmin Zurbriggen didn't finish the slalom in this way too), he always didn't interpret losses as an unluck though it seemed so for the public. He did hold the view that his opponents did it better than he (quite often he was - unexpected - intercepted as a race-leader, and in the FIS Alpine Skiing World Championships 1989, he was third in the Super-G but at last Tomaž Čižman (22nd starter) could obtain the bronze medal. He now runs a skiing and snowboard school in his hometown Warth.

World Cup victories

Overall victories

Individual victories

References

 Sports Reference

External links
 
 

1962 births
Living people
Austrian male alpine skiers
Olympic alpine skiers of Austria
Alpine skiers at the 1984 Winter Olympics
Alpine skiers at the 1988 Winter Olympics
Alpine skiers at the 1992 Winter Olympics
Olympic gold medalists for Austria
Olympic silver medalists for Austria
Olympic medalists in alpine skiing
FIS Alpine Ski World Cup champions
Medalists at the 1988 Winter Olympics
Sportspeople from Vorarlberg